or Motokochan in Wonder Kitchen is a 1993 Super Famicom point-and-click video game that features minigames related to cooking. The game was a promotional item with a production run of 10,000 units which were used for a lottery contest. Consumers who mailed in two proof of purchase seals from Ajinomoto mayonnaise received a copy of the game and were entered into the contest, which was run over five months with 2,000 prizes given away monthly.

Gameplay 
Name brand products from Japanese supermarkets are used as an advertising gimmick from the company Ajinomoto. A young girl named Motoko takes children through a fantasy world and provides educational and informative content about the history of mayonnaise and other things that are related to food history.  Games include reversi against a witch and finding seven dwarves that turn into sausages. The gameplay is somewhat similar to the more widely known Nintendo DS title Cooking Mama, which was released more than a decade later in 2006.

The game supports the Super Famicom Mouse.

Items

Food 

 Tomato
 Cabbage
 Salt
 Pepper
 Mayonnaise
 Tuna
 Mushrooms

Utensils 

 Spoon
 Chef's Knife
 Chopsticks
 Cooking Pot
 Drainer
 Oven
 Microwave

References 

1993 video games
Ajinomoto
Advergames
Children's educational video games
Cooking video games
Japan-exclusive video games
Super Nintendo Entertainment System games
Super Nintendo Entertainment System-only games
Video games developed in Japan
Single-player video games